Kaiser San Francisco Medical Center consists of four Kaiser Permanente medical office and center campuses in San Francisco, California.

History

French Hospital
The French Hospital of San Francisco, officially La Societe Francaise de Bienfaisance Mutuelle, was founded in 1851 as San Francisco's first private hospital. It was originally located on Rincon Hill. Later locations were Bryant at 5th Streets (1856), and Point Lobos Avenue (now Geary) (1895). A new French Hospital was dedicated on May 4, 1963. It is now known as the "French Campus" of Kaiser Permanente.

Consolidation
Kaiser Permanente has the main San Francisco Medical Center, the Geary Hospital, French Campus, and Mission Bay all forming Kaiser's San Francisco presence.

Incidents
In 2008, 960 babies were potentially exposed to tuberculosis at the hospital's postpartum unit.

In 2010 the hospital was fined US$100,000 for failing to properly treat a diabetic patient that later died.

References

External links

Kaiser Permanente hospitals
Buildings and structures in San Francisco
Hospitals in San Francisco
Hospitals in the San Francisco Bay Area